Emily Elliott may refer to:

 Emily Elliott (1893–1983) of the Elliott sisters, Irish nationalist
 Emily Louise Orr Elliott (1867–1952), Canadian artist and fashion designer